The Bates College Museum of Art (also known locally simply as the Museum of Art or MoA) is an art museum located on the campus of, and maintained by, Bates College in Lewiston, Maine. It holds various mediums of arts that showcase Maine and the greater American area. The museum's collection offers an overview of modern and contemporary art. The Museum publishes numerous art collections, and art publications every year. The primary focuses of the main collections are works on paper, including modern and contemporary art including drawings, prints and photographs.

It is the largest museum of art in the city of Lewiston, Maine, followed by Museum L/A.  In the 1930s, the college secured a private holding from the Museum of Modern Art of Vincent van Gogh's Starry Night, for students participating in the 'Bates Plan'. It holds 8,000 pieces and objects of contemporary domestic and international art. The museum holds over 100 original artworks, photographs, and sketches from Marsden Hartley. The MoA offers numerous lectures, artist symposiums, and workshops.

The entire space is split into three components: the larger Upper Gallery, the smaller Lower Gallery, and the Synergy Gallery which is primarily used for student exhibits and research. Almost 20,000 visitors are attracted to the MoA annually. The museum opened on October 7, 1955, as the Treat Gallery by Norma Berger, the niece of Marsden Hartley. With the ushering of the Olin Arts Center on to the campus, the gallery was formed into the Museum of Art at Bates College in 1986. The scope was also increased to facilitate educational programming in sync to the scholarly pursuits of the college and with the Lewiston-Auburn community.

In 2005, the museum reorganized into four galleries: the Bates Gallery, Collection Gallery, the Underground Synergy Seminar space, and the 150 Art Reader Stairwell.

History

The Bates College Art Museum was founded in 1955 as the Treat Gallery in the newly constructed Pettigrew Building at Bates College. Norma Berger, the niece of Marsden Hartley, a notable Maine artist, donated a large collection at the founding of the museum. In 1986, the gallery moved to the new Olin Art Center gallery. After the renovation and installation, the new and expanded museum space enabled the Museum to organize major scholarly exhibitions of contemporary and historic artists. Many of these exhibitions were from "significant solo shows to thematic group shows that investigate ideas important to disciplines across the liberal arts curriculum, and permanent collection exhibitions, supported by scholarly publications." Over the past decade, the collection has grown to collect more art pieces of all mediums and support educational curriculum across disciplines.

In 2005, the museum reorganized into four galleries: the Bates Gallery, Collection Gallery, the Underground Synergy Seminar space, and the 150 Art Reader Stairwell. As of 2022 the director of the museum is Dan Mills.

Collections and notable exhibitions

As of 2022, it holds over 8,000 objects, including select and growing holdings of contemporary Chinese art, pre-Columbian art, Japanese woodblock prints, and African art. In addition to the original Marsden Hartley Memorial Collection, the museum contains works by many other notable artists. The museum has focused on collecting works of Maine artists. In the 1930s, the college secured a private holding from the Museum of Modern Art of Vincent van Gogh's Starry Night.

In 2016, the Museum has the following exhibitions: "The View Out His Window (and in his mind’s eye)" by Jeffery Becton, "The Art of Occupy: The Occuprint Portfolio", and "Maine Collected."

Teaching and education 
The Bates College Museum of Art also offers curricular involvement with both the college and surrounding communities. The college uses the museum through their exhibitions and collections to "teach writing skills and visual literacy, the museum serves as a tool for educators and students."

Gallery

References

External links

Bates College
Educational buildings in Lewiston, Maine
1955 establishments in Maine
University museums in Maine
Museums in Androscoggin County, Maine
Art museums and galleries in Maine
Art museums established in 1955
Tourist attractions in Lewiston, Maine